The Visual Effects Society Award for Outstanding Visual Effects in an Animated Feature is one of the annual awards given by the Visual Effects Society starting from 2008.

Winners and nominees

2000s

2010s

2020s

References

Visual Effects Society Awards
Awards established in 2008